Calceranica al Lago (Calzerànega in local dialect) is a comune (municipality) in Trentino in the northern Italian region Trentino-Alto Adige/Südtirol, located about  east of Trento.

Calceranica al Lago borders the following municipalities: Pergine Valsugana, Bosentino, Caldonazzo, Vattaro, and Centa San Nicolò.

Demographic evolution

References

Cities and towns in Trentino-Alto Adige/Südtirol